John Francis Kiley Jr. (January 5, 1929 – February 16, 1982) was an American professional basketball player. Kiley was selected in the 1951 NBA Draft by the Fort Wayne Pistons after a collegiate career at Syracuse. He played for the Pistons in 1951–52 and the beginning of 1952–53 and averaged 2.3 points, 1.0 rebounds and 1.2 assists per contest in 53 career games.

Born in Irvington, New Jersey, Kiley played high school basketball at Seton Hall Preparatory School.

References

1929 births
1982 deaths
American men's basketball players
Basketball players from New Jersey
Fort Wayne Pistons draft picks
Fort Wayne Pistons players
Seton Hall Preparatory School alumni
Shooting guards
Sportspeople from Essex County, New Jersey
People from Irvington, New Jersey
Syracuse Orange men's basketball players